Pusztaszemes is a village in Somogy County, Hungary. It is known for being the birthplace of János Kádár's father, János Krezinger.

Etymology
The name of Pusztaszemes originates from the words szem and puszta because this area depopulated during the Turkish occupation. It is also possible that the village got its name after its first owner, a man called Szemes.

Geography
It lies on the Outer Somogy Hill Range, 10 km south of Balatonföldvár, in the southern end of the Kőröshegy-Pusztaszemes Valley. The Brook Séd and Brook Jaba have their sources there. The first flows to the North in the Lake Balaton, the second to the South in the River Koppány.

History
Pusztaszemes was first mentioned in 1229 as Scernes. I also appears in the papal tithe register between 1332 and 1337. In 1536 it was written as Waralyazemes (Waralya means Castle bottom). Ottoman Porte's tax register mentioned it initially, later it became uninhabited. After the Siege of Buda the Hungarian nobility invited Christian settlers (mostly Roman Catholic) to Hungary. Until 1778 several German families arrived to Pusztaszemes who rebuilt the village. The landowner was the Széchényi family, but several residents had smaller portions of lands. According to the 1853 census the village had 340 residents of which 258 were Germans and 82 Hungarians. Its Roman Catholic church was built in 1860 and was dedicated to Saint Wendelin.

Main sights
 Roman Catholic Church - built in 1860 and dedicated to Saint Wendelin
 monument for the heroes of the First and the Second World War
 traditional houses
 house of János Krezinger, father of János Kádár - at the edge of the village next to the forest

External links 
 Street map (Hungarian)

References 

Populated places in Somogy County
Hungarian German communities in Somogy County